Precious Memories is the 20th solo studio album by American country music singer Barbara Mandrell. It was released May 1, 1989, by Heartland Music and was sold through television and radio advertisements. The album is a collection of gospel standards and was produced by Tom Collins. It is Mandrell's second album of gospel music, following 1984's He Set My Life to Music.

Background
Precious Memories was released May 1, 1989, by Heartland Music through Quality Special Products with marketing and promotion being handled by Nashville-based 1-800-COUNTRY. The album was only available as a direct-mail release, being sold through radio and television advertisements, as well as being advertised in the fan magazine Music City News. The entire album was also sent to radio music directors for promotional purposes. It was released on LP, cassette, and CD.

Track listing

Personnel
Adapted from the album liner notes.

Performance
David Briggs – piano, synthesizer
Larry Byrom – electric guitar
Jimmy Capps – guitar
Mitch Humphries – piano
David Hungate – bass
Bobby Jones – background vocals
Shane Keister – piano, synthesizer
Barbara Mandrell – lead vocals
New Life – background vocals
featuring Emily Harris, Frances Belcher, Jan Whittacker, Robin Johnson, and Angela Wright
Bobby Ogdin – piano, organ
Brent Rowan – guitar, electric guitar
Milton Sledge – drums
Bob Wray – bass

Production
Terry Blackwood – arrangements
Ray Burdett – arrangements
Tom Collins – producer
Lura Foster – arrangements
Ben Harris – engineer
David Hassell – arrangements
Paula Imes – studio assistant
Les Ladd – engineer, mixing
Derek Lee – arrangements
Keith Odle – assistant engineer
Denny Purcell – mastering

Other personnel
Teddy Heard – project coordinator
The Stanford Group – jacket design

References

1989 albums
Barbara Mandrell albums
Gospel albums by American artists
Albums produced by Tom Collins (record producer)